Lieutenant-General Sir George Cornish Whitlock (1798–1868) was a British Madras Army officer, who commanded the Madras Column (also called the Saugor and Nerbudda field force) during the Indian Mutiny.

Life
Whitlock was baptised on 3 August 1803 at Ottery St Mary, Devon, son of George and Charlotte. He was colonel of the 108th Regiment of Foot (Madras Infantry) from 1862 to his death.

He died aged 69 on Thursday 30 January 1868 at Exmouth, Devon.

Family
Whitlock married Harriet, daughter of Sir Samuel Toller on 19 February 1825 in Bangalore, Madras, India.

Notes

References

 online copy:

External links
Banda and Kirwee Prize Money

1798 births
1868 deaths
British military personnel of the Indian Rebellion of 1857
British East India Company Army generals
People from Ottery St Mary
Military personnel from Devon